Gustaf Nordenskiöld (29 June 1868 – 6 June 1895) was a Swedish scholar of Finnish-Swedish descent who was the first to scientifically study the ancient Pueblo ruins in Mesa Verde. He was a member of the Nordenskiöld family of scientists and the eldest son of polar explorer Baron Adolf Erik Nordenskiöld and his equally aristocratic wife, Anna Maria Mannerheim.

Nordenskiöld was featured on the Ken Burns PBS series The National Parks: America's Best Idea.

Early life 
Nordenskiöld completed school at Beskowska skolan in Stockholm and studied at Uppsala University and the new University of Stockholm, graduating with a B.A. from Uppsala in 1889. The next year (1890) he traveled to Svalbard together with J. A. Björling and A. Klinckowström, bringing a collection of plant fossils back to the Swedish Museum of Natural History. After his return, he was diagnosed with tuberculosis and went to Berlin for treatment.

Nordenskiöld in America
Nordenskiöld's North American segment of a world tour began when he landed in New York on 27 May 1891 aboard the SS Waesland of the Red Star Line. (Letter No. 2, The Letters of Gustaf Nordenskiöld Mesa Verde 1991). In Letter No. 9 from Charleston, North Carolina, he tells his father to address letters to the Swedish Consulate in San Francisco and on 27 June 1891 he wrote to his mother from Denver, Colorado, and included a request that further letters be addressed to the Swedish Consulate in Yokohama, Japan, so the world tour was still on his mind. Three days later, on 30 June 1891, also from Denver, he tells his father that tomorrow he was going to Durango, Colorado, and the "Mancos Valley" where there are a "number of cliff dwellings".

This break in the itinerary of his world tour was permanent.

When Nordenskiöld arrived in Durango he made arrangements to stay with cattle rancher Richard Wetherill at the Alamo Ranch in Mancos, Colorado.  This is confirmed in a 2 July 1893 letter to his father in which he requests his photographic equipment, consisting of a camera, tripod, lens, cassette for photographic plates, shutter, dark cloth, and "as well as my barometer". (Letter No. 15, The Letters of Gustaf Nordenskiöld Mesa Verde 1991.) He also says in the same letter that his father should answer by telegram whether he should remain where he is.
 
He worked with Wetherill, discoverer of the Mesa Verde ruins in 1888, and Charles Mason. The Wetherill's led Nordenskiöld through the canyons and sandstone cliffs of the Mesa Verde ruins where he applied his European scientific training, conducting the first archaeological excavation of the cliff dwellings. Nordenskiöld employed Wetherill to supervise excavations at Mesa Verde and trained Wetherill in a number of techniques, such as how to use a trowel (he had been using a shovel). Nordenskiöld explained to Wetherill the importance of documentation.

Arrest and exoneration
In the late 19th century, there were no laws against treasure-hunting or selling artifacts in Colorado; in addition to the ever-present threat of vandalism and looting, scholars and tourists alike had the habit of taking valuable items from Mesa Verde as trophies. In this climate, Nordenskiöld loaded Mesa Verde artifacts into Denver and Rio Grande Western Railroad boxcars in Durango, Colorado, and headed for Europe, with most of the items eventually ending up at the National Museum of Finland.

Nordenskiöld biographers Judith Reynolds and David Reynolds describe the ensuing situation as an "international incident." Angry locals charged Nordenskiöld with "devastating the ruins" and had him arrested at midnight at the Strater Hotel even though there were no laws at the time supporting such a charge. In addition to the issue of removing artifacts, xenophobia may have played a role in Nordenskiöld's arrest. In the December 9, 2005, Denver Post article, Electra Draper wrote: "...residents of Durango were beginning to think foreigners shouldn't be removing local artifacts." No intervention was taken against Americans who were also looting the sites.

When Nordenskiöld was arrested on 17 September 1891 he sent this telegram to his father: "much trouble some expense no danger" (original omits capitalization). Letter No. 31, The Letters of Gustaf Nordenskiöld Mesa Verde 1991.

In the end, Nordenskiöld took more than 150 photographs of Mesa Verde, and logged multiple sites.

Originally published in a Stockholm newspaper, and then later written in the preface to his 1892 book "From the Far West, Memories of America" Nordenskiöld states "The free roaming nomadic life, which this research forced me into, appealed greatly to my spirit and created a desire for excursions farther into the deserts of the American West. I decided to go roaming on horseback with two companions through the northern part of Arizona." He made this trip, actually through Indian country in Colorado, Utah and Arizona, which went as far as the Grand Canyon. (Kungl. Boktryckeriet P.A. Norstedt & Soner Stockholm, 1892. In English, The Mesa Verde Museum Association, Mesa Verde National Park, CO 81330)

In 1893 he published one of the first books about Mesa Verde, The Cliff Dwellers of Mesa Verde, Southwestern Colorado: Their Pottery and Implements, a monumental report of his excavations, describing in detail the buildings, pottery, skeletal remains, and tools found at the sites.

A full rendering of Gustaf Nordenskiöld's book in the 1893 version (see pg. v) is here http://babel.hathitrust.org/cgi/pt?id=inu.30000029476458. (Courtesy of the Hilthi Trust Digital Library, University of Michigan Library.)

After his return from America, Nordenskiöld occupied himself with mineralogical studies, but his health started to deteriorate again in 1894.  He died on June 6, 1895, aboard a train traveling to Jämtland, only 27 years old.

As he predeceased his father the Baron, he did not inherit the family title, which therefore passed to his brother Erland, on the death of their father, in 1901.

Archives and collections 
Nordenskiöld's collections from Mesa Verde were bought by a Finnish collector who eventually donated them to the University of Helsinki. They are now held by the National Museum of Finland and were on display at the Museum of Cultures in the Tennispalatsi building in central Helsinki, as part of the collection called "Fetched from Afar" (Kaukaa Haettua) until 19 May 2013. The Royal Swedish Academy of Sciences contains an archive of photographs, notes, correspondence and newspaper clippings. The Riksarkivet includes letters to his father from Washington, Philadelphia, Charleston, Mammoth Cave (in Kentucky), Durango, Navajo Canyon, and other locations.

Publications 
 From the Far West, Memories of America. G. Nordenskiold. Translated by Larry E. Scott and Kent R. Olson. Reprinted 2010, East Hall Press, Augustana College. Originally published in 1892 as Från Fjärran Västern, Minnen från Amerika in Stockholm by P. A. Norstedt & Söners. 
 The Cliff Dwellers of the Mesa Verde, Southwestern Colorado: Their Pottery and Implements. Appendix: Human remains from the Cliff Dwellings of the Mesa Verde. G. Nordenskiold. Translated by D. L. Morgan. Reprinted 2017 by FB&C Limited. Originally published in 1893 as Ruiner af Klippboningar i Mesa Verde's Cañons in Stockholm by P. A. Norstedt & Söners. 
 The Letters of Gustaf Nordenskiold - with Articles from Ymer and Photographic Times. Publisher: Mesa Verde Museum Association in 1991. .

See also
 Adolf Erik Nordenskiöld
 Erland Nordenskiöld

References

Further reading 

 The Cliff Dwellings of the Cañons of the Mesa Verde:
Publisher(s): American Geographical Society;
Author(s):  W. R. Birdsall;
Source:  Journal of the American Geographical Society of New York, Vol. 23,  (1891), pp. 584–620
 The Cliff Dwellers of the Mesa Verde:
Publisher(s): American Geographical Society;
Reviewed Authors(s):  G. Nordenskiold;
Source:  The Journal of the Anthropological Institute of Great Britain and Ireland, Vol. 23,  (1894), pp. 434–435
 Stones Speak and Waters Sing, The Life and Works of Gustaf Nordenskiold, Olof Arrhenius, edited and annotated by Robert H. Lister and Florence C. Lister. Mesa Verde Museum Association 1984
 Diamond, Irving L., "Much Trouble Some Expense No Danger" Mesa Verde National Park. Proceedings of the Anasazi Symposium 1991. .
 Reynolds, Judith, & Reynolds, David. Nordenskiold of Mesa Verde, Xlibris Corporation, April 2006. , paperback.

External links
 

1868 births
1895 deaths
Historians of Native Americans
Finnish explorers
Scientists from Helsinki
Stockholm University alumni
Swedish explorers
19th-century Swedish nobility
Swedish-speaking Finns
Finnish anthropologists
Denver and Rio Grande Western Railroad
Mesa Verde National Park
Swedish people of Finnish descent